Songs of a Dead Dreamer is the debut studio album by DJ Spooky. It was released through Asphodel Records on April 2, 1996.

In 2015, Fact placed it at number 10 on the "50 Best Trip-Hop Albums of All Time" list.

Track listing

Personnel
Credits adapted from liner notes.
 Nikolas van Egten – writing, production
 Paul D. Miller – production, promotion
 Arto Lindsay – guitar (on "Dance of the Morlocks")
 Mica – saxophone (on "Nihilismus Dub")

References

External links
 

1996 debut albums
DJ Spooky albums